UFC Fight Night: McGregor vs. Siver (also known as UFC Fight Night 59) was a mixed martial arts event held on January 18, 2015, at the TD Garden in Boston, Massachusetts.

Background
The event was headlined by a featherweight bout between Conor McGregor and Dennis Siver. It was announced that a victory over Siver will ensure McGregor of a shot at the UFC Featherweight Championship in his next fight.

Jorge Masvidal was expected to face Norman Parke at the event.  However, in early December, Masvidal pulled out of the bout citing an injury and was replaced by Gleison Tibau.

Paul Felder was expected to face Johnny Case at the event. However, Felder elected to fight as a replacement against Danny Castillo at UFC 182. He was replaced by Francisco Treviño. On December 23, it was announced that Treviño had to pull out of the bout due to an injury and was replaced by promotional newcomer Frankie Perez.

Costas Philippou was expected to face Uriah Hall at the event. However, Philippou was forced out of the bout due to injury. He was replaced by Strikeforce veteran Louis Taylor. On January 11, it was announced that Taylor pulled out of the fight due to a pulled muscle in his back and had his contract terminated as a result.  Hall faced promotional newcomer Ron Stallings.

Eddie Alvarez was expected to face former WEC & UFC Lightweight champion Benson Henderson at the co-main event. However, Alvarez was forced out of the bout due to illness. He was replaced by Donald Cerrone, whom Henderson fought twice before (at WEC 43 and WEC 48) and won both fights. One fight was for the WEC Lightweight Championship and the other one was for the interim belt. Cerrone had previously fought just 15 days before this event at UFC 182, winning his fight against Myles Jury.

Results

Bonus awards
The following fighters were awarded $50,000 bonuses:
Fight of the Night: Sean O'Connell vs. Matt Van Buren
Performance of the Night: Conor McGregor and Lorenz Larkin

Reported payout
The following is the reported payout to the fighters as reported to the Massachusetts State Athletic Commission. It does not include sponsor money or "locker room" bonuses often given by the UFC and also do not include the UFC's traditional "fight night" bonuses.

Conor McGregor: $170,000 (includes $85,000 win bonus) def. Dennis Siver: $39,000
Donald Cerrone: $146,000 (includes $73,000 win bonus) def. Benson Henderson: $48,000
Uriah Hall: $28,000 (includes $14,000 win bonus) def. Ron Stallings: $10,000
Gleison Tibau: $90,000 (includes $45,000 win bonus) def. Norman Parke: $20,000
Cathal Pendred: $16,000 (includes $8,000 win bonus) def. Sean Spencer: $14,000 ^
Lorenz Larkin: $56,000 (includes $28,000 win bonus) def. John Howard: $21,000
Chris Wade: $20,000 (includes $10,000 win bonus) def. Zhang Lieping: $15,000
Patrick Holohan: $20,000 (includes $10,000 win bonus) def. Shane Howell: $8,000
Johnny Case: $20,000 (includes $10,000 win bonus) def. Frankie Perez: $8,000
Charles Rosa: $20,000 (includes $10,000 win bonus) def. Sean Soriano: $8,000
Sean O'Connell: $20,000 (includes $10,000 win bonus) def. Matt Van Buren $8,000
Joby Sanchez: $16,000 (includes $8,000 win bonus) def. Tateki Matsuda: $8,000

^ Although not reflected in the Massachusetts State Athletic Commission paperwork, both Pendred and Spencer ($14,000) received win bonuses

See also
List of UFC events
2015 in UFC

References

UFC Fight Night
2015 in Boston
2015 in mixed martial arts
2015 in sports in Massachusetts
January 2015 sports events in the United States
Mixed martial arts in Massachusetts
Sports competitions in Boston
Events in Boston